Elise van Hage (born 6 April 1989 in Noordwijkerhout) is a Dutch professional racing cyclist.

Career wins

2004 - Dutch National Road Race Championships, Novices, The Netherlands (F) (NED)
2005 - Dutch National Road Race Championships, Novices, The Netherlands (F) (NED)
2005 - Dutch National Track Championships, Sprint, Juniors, The Netherlands (F) (NED)
2005 - Dutch National Track Championships, 500 m, Juniors, The Netherlands (F) (NED)
2005 - Dutch National Track Championships, Scratch, Juniors, The Netherlands (F) (NED)
2005 - Dutch National Track Championships, Keirin, Juniors, The Netherlands (F) (NED)
2006 - European Championship, Track, Points race, Juniors (F), Athens
2006 - European Championship, Track, Scratch, Juniors (F), Athens
2006 - World Championship, Track, Scratch, Juniors (F), Gent
2006 - 2006 Dutch National Track Championships, 500 m, Juniors, The Netherlands (F), Alkmaar (NED)
2006 - 2006 Dutch National Track Championships, Scratch, Juniors, The Netherlands (F), Alkmaar (NED)
2006 - 2006 Dutch National Track Championships, Points race, Juniors, The Netherlands (F), Alkmaar (NED)
2007 - Dutch National Road Race Championships, Juniors, The Netherlands (F) (NED)
2007 - 3rd place, Scratch race, 2007 Dutch National Track Championships
2008 (Team Flexpoint)
2008 - World University Cycling Championship, Road Race
2008 - Scratch race, 2008 Dutch National Track Championships
2010 - 3rd place, Dutch National Team Time Trial Championships (together with Aafke Eshuis and Nathalie van Gogh)

National record, team pursuit

After the introduction of the women's 3000m team pursuit at the 2007–08 track cycling season, Van Hage was once part of the team pursuit squad when they established a new Dutch national record. She is not the record holder anymore.

References

External links

1989 births
Living people
People from Noordwijkerhout
Dutch female cyclists
Dutch track cyclists
Cyclists from South Holland
20th-century Dutch women
21st-century Dutch women